Endre Mistéth (10 September 1912 in Buziásfürdő – 12 July 2006) Hungarian bridge engineer, minister, winner of Szechenyi prize, builder of numerous bridges in Budapest following World War II.

Early career
Mistath was born in Buziásfürdő, Temes County. His father's family was of French Huguenot origin, and his mother's side was of Greek-Serbian descent. After the Treaty of Trianon, the family moved from what became Romanian territory to Hungary. He began his studies at Matyas Hunyadi military academy, originally intending for a career in the army, but eventually graduated from the Budapest Technical University in 1935. He began work in the Ganz rail factory and later took part in the building of roads between Székesfehérvár and Graz. He opened his own practice in 1940. Among his early work was a cable bridge in Szolnok which at the time was the largest of its kind in Europe. He took part in the resistance during the Second World War.

After 1945
Following the war, all of the bridges linking the two sides of the Danube in Budapest had to be rebuilt, as they had been blown up by the retreating German forces. Misteth designed the first temporary bridge (the "Manci") and the first permanent one, the Kossuth Bridge (it was later demolished as the other bridges were rebuilt).

He also became involved in politics. In 1945 he became the Secretary of State in the Ministry of Works during the tenure of the Independent Smallholder's Party prior to the Communist takeover of the country. In the following year he became Minister for reconstruction but was put in prison following the so-called "Hungarian Society" show trial in 1947. He was released in 1955 but had to endure the following three and a half years under house arrest. After the 1960s he became an academic, finishing a doctorate in 1978.

Main works
Manci and Kossuth bridges, Budapest
Erzsébet bridge, Budapest (with others)
Heluani Nile bridge, Egypt
Orontesz Valley bridge, Syria
Garmat bridge, Iraq
Tisza bridge, Máramarossziget
Bős-nagymaros dam (with others)

1912 births
2006 deaths
People from Buziaș
Bridge engineers
Hungarian people of French descent
Hungarian people of Greek descent
Hungarian people of Serbian descent
Budapest University of Technology and Economics alumni
20th-century Hungarian engineers